The South Carolina Poetry Archives at Furman University is a collection of published works, manuscripts, and ephemeral materials from over one hundred authors.  It is housed in Greenville, South Carolina, at the Special Collections and Archives department of the James B. Duke Library.

Purpose
Started in 2005, the archives highlights 20th and 21st century poets connected to South Carolina by birth, employment, residence, or subject matter.  Among the most extensively collected authors are Gilbert Allen, Claire Bateman, Phebe Davidson, Kurtis Lamkin, and Ronald Moran.  The collection includes works of all South Carolina poets laureate, literary fellows selected by the South Carolina Arts Commission and the National Endowment for the Arts, Pushcart Prize winners, Piccolo Spoleto Fiction prize winners, and recipients of many other awards.

In the context of Furman University's emphasis on "engaged learning," the Poetry Archives also provides a gateway for university students. Furman professors draw on the manuscripts, correspondence and ephemeral materials made available in the collection to integrate South Carolina poetry into their curricula and acquaint students with the construction and publication of poetry.

The South Carolina Poetry Archives acquired Ninety-Six Press, established at Furman in 1991, as part of the Department of Special Collections and Archives in the James B. Duke Library at Furman.

Collection inventory

See also
 Furman University
 Greenville, South Carolina
 South Carolina Baptist Historical Collection

References

External links
South Carolina Poetry Archives website
Furman University website
Special Collections and Archives website
James B. Duke Library website

Furman University
Archives in the United States
University and college academic libraries in the United States
American poetry
Education in Greenville, South Carolina
Research libraries in the United States